The fourth season of The Golden Girls premiered on NBC on October 8, 1988, and concluded on May 13, 1989. The season consisted of 26 episodes.

Broadcast history
The season originally aired Saturdays at 9:00-9:30 pm (EST) on NBC from October 8, 1988 to May 13, 1989.

Episodes

References

External links

Golden Girls (season 4)
1988 American television seasons
1989 American television seasons